Jully Black (born Jullyann Inderia Gordon Black, November 8, 1977) is a Canadian singer-songwriter, producer and actress. She has collaborated and written for many artists, including Nas, Saukrates, Choclair, Kardinal Offishall, Destiny's Child, and Sean Paul. 

She was chosen by CBC Music as one of "The 25 Greatest Canadian Singers Ever" and has been dubbed "Canada's Queen of R&B" by her fans and peers.

Early life
Jullyann Inderia Gordon Black was born to Jamaican immigrants. She is the youngest of nine children, she grew up in the North York district in the neighbourhood of Jane and Finch in Toronto, Ontario. After her parents divorced when Black was a child, she was raised in a strict Pentecostal household by her single mother, Aretha.

Musical career

At age 19, Black was discovered by Warner/Chappell Music who immediately signed her.  Shortly after, she was courted by Universal Music Canada where she was offered a deal to help propel her career.  Black capitalized on these opportunities , which saw her garner her first Juno Award nomination in 1997 and continue to be nominated almost every year thereafter as well as having the opportunities to collaborate with and/or write for other well-known artists such as Nas, Destiny's Child, Sean Paul, Kardinal Offishall, and many others.

Black had a Top 40 hit on the Canadian charts with 1998's "Rally'n".  Subsequent singles also charted, such as "You Changed" and "Between Me and U".  In the same year, she was invited to contribute to Rascalz' groundbreaking hip hop single, "Northern Touch", but was unable to participate due to other commitments. In 1999, she appeared on 2Rude's single "Dissin Us", which won the MuchMusic Video Award for Best R&B/Soul Video in 2000.

Black's debut album was originally scheduled for release in 2014 on MCA Records, under the title I Traveled, but was shelved after MCA folded that same year. 

In Summer 2005, a newly recorded album, This Is Me, was released by Universal Music Canada.  The album included the hit singles "Sweat of Your Brow" and "5x Love". According to a piracy report by IFPI, there were "2.8 million illegal file swapping requests for her music in the first two weeks of her album's release". 

Also in the same year, Black played the Preacher in the theatre production of "Da Kink in My Hair" at the Princess of Wales Theatre in Downtown Toronto.  The play was a critical success  as it sold out all of its 106 performances, being extended 5 times.  This led to the weekly TV series on the Global Television Network, with Black singing the opening theme and being featured in two episodes. 

In Summer 2007, her new single, "Seven Day Fool", was released, becoming Black's first Top 10 hit in Canada.  Her second album, Revival, was released on October 16, 2007, and was awarded the Juno for R&B/Soul Recording of the Year. 

Black was a correspondent on the sixth season of the CTV reality competition show Canadian Idol and hosted the 2008 Canadian Radio Music Awards.  She has also been a celebrity reporter for the CTV daily entertainment news magazine program, etalk. Black is also a featured weekly guest panelist on the CTV daytime talk show, The Marilyn Denis Show, and has been a multiple presenter at both the 2010 and 2011 P&G Beauty & Grooming Awards. 

In 2009, Black, alongside YoungPete Alexander and Kellis E. Parker, wrote and released her third studio album, The Black Book.  Following its release, Black kicked off a country-wide tour in Vancouver at the 2010 Winter Olympics. In 2011, Black and YoungPete created a new production team known as "The Officials". Together, they've written and produced songs for an upcoming album tentatively titled: Made In Canada. 

In 2010, a new song by Black, "At the Roncies" (about the Roncesvalles Avenue neighbourhood of Toronto), was the song chosen by listeners to represent the province of Ontario in CBC Radio 2's Great Canadian Song Quest.

Black was selected to perform and open for Celine Dion at the 2012 Jamaica Jazz and Blues Festival honouring Jamaica's 50th Anniversary of Independence in 2012.

In 2012, Black was nominated for a 2012 Juno Award for 'Best R&B/Soul Recording' for her song "Set It Off" featuring Kardinal Offishall. In the same year, Black released an EP, Dropping W(8), a reference to her having these songs and feeling a weight on her shoulders.

In 2020, Black performed on FreeUp! The Emancipation Day Special.

In 2022, Black was announced as a competitor in the eighth season of The Amazing Race Canada and was eliminated on the first leg after she and her partner Kathy missed the entrance to the Rialto theater allowing the trailing Cedric & Tychon to catch up.

In 2023, she sang the Canadian national anthem at the 2023 NBA All-Star Game. Black changed the lyrics from “our home and native land" to "our home on native land" as a mark of respect  to the Indigenous groups within Canada. In the same year she participated in an all-star recording of Serena Ryder's single "What I Wouldn't Do", which was released as a charity single to benefit Kids Help Phone's Feel Out Loud campaign for youth mental health.

Discography

Albums
 2000: I Travelled (unreleased)
 2005: This Is Me
 2007: Revival
 2009: The Black Book
 2012: 8ight
 2015: Jully Black 
 2022: Three Rocks and a Slingshot

Official mixtapes
 2012: Dropping W(8)

Singles

Soundtracks
 2010: George Stroumboulopoulos Tonight – Episode #7.24 (performer: "At The Roncies")
 2008: Saving God (performer: "I Travelled")
 2007: Da Kink in My Hair (composer: theme music - 5 episodes)
 2006: Words to Music: The Canadian Songwriters Hall of Fame (TV film) (performer: "Put Your Hand in the Hand")
 2004: You Got Served (performer: "Heaven")
 2003: The Fighting Temptations (writer: "I Know")
 2002: Brown Sugar (performer: "You Changed")
Sweat of Your Brow" (Tricky Moreira [Just BE Remix]) (WINNER) 2004: Gemini Award for Best Performance or Host in a Variety Program or Series for: Tonya Lee Williams: Gospel Jubilee (NOMINATION)
 2003: Juno Award for "Best R&B/Soul Song", "You Changed" (NOMINATION)
 2002: MuchMusic Video Award Viewers Choice for Best Canadian Collaboration or Group, "The Day Before" (NOMINATION)
 2002: MuchMusic Video Award for "Best Rap Video", "Light It Up" (NOMINATION)
 2001: Juno Award for "Best Rap recording", "Money Jane" (NOMINATION)
 1999: MuchMusic Video Award for "Best R&B/Soul Video". "Rally'n" (NOMINATION)
 1999: Juno Award for "Best R&B/Soul Song". "Rally'n" (NOMINATION)
 1998: MuchMusic Video Award for "Best Rap Video", "360" (NOMINATION)
 1997: Juno Award for "Best Rap Recording", "What It Takes" (WINNER)'''

Recognitions and achievements
 2008: CRIA Certified Gold, Revival
 2004: CRIA Certified Platinum "Women & Songs 7"
 2003: RIAA Certified Platinum "God's Son" Nas
 2001: CRIA Certified Platinum, "All Stars 2001"
 2001: CRIA Certified Double Platinum, Sugar Jones "Sugar Jones"
 2001: CRIA Certified Gold, Baby Blue Sound Crew Private party Vol. 2
 2000: CRIA Certified Gold, Baby Blue Sound Crew Private party Vol. 1
 2000: CRIA Certified Triple Platinum, "All Stars 2000"
 1999: CRIA Certified Gold, Choclair's "Ice Cold"
 1999: CRIA Certified Double Platinum, "Dance Hits"

Filmography

Network television performances
 2012: Canada AM (Duet with Donny Parenteau, Alright With Me)
 2012: The Marilyn Denis Show (Fugitive)
 2012: CBC's Canada Day Celebration (O Canada/Seven Days Fool)
 2010: CTV's "Juno Awards", Presenter/Performer
 2010: CTV's Winter Olympics Opening Ceremonies
 2004: CBC's NHL Awards
 2004: CBC's Tonya Lee Williams Gospel Jubilee
 2004: Show Time/Soul Food Productions Presents "We Plan" Episode #064. Role, Jully Black
 2004: MuchMusic Presents "Behind the Threads" an up-close look at the women of the Garment industry. Jully Black travels to Dhaka, Bangladesh to cover the story
 2003: Toronto 1 Live Performance
 2003: MTV's "Break Out"
 2003: CTV's "Juno Award Presentation". Presented Shania Twain the "Artist of the Year" Award
 2001: Citytv's New Years Celebration
 2001: MuchMusic's "9/11" Music Tribute and Fund Raiser
 2001: MuchMusic's "Da Mix" Final Episode
 2001: CBC's "Juno Award Presentation"
 2000: MuchMusic's "Da Mix" Tenth Year Anniversary Special
 1999: MuchMusic's "Da Mix" Black History Celebration
 1998: Citytv's "Electric Circus"
 1997: Citytv's "Breakfast Television"

Television and film appearances
 2022: The Amazing Race Canada 8, Contestant
 2012: The Marilyn Denis Show, Panelist
– Episode #2.79 (2012) … Herself
– Episode #2.44 (2011) … Herself
– Episode #1.15 (2011) … Herself
 2010: George Stroumboulopoulos Tonight
– Episode #7.24 (2010) … Herself - Performer
– Episode dated December 2, 2009 (2009) … Herself
 2009: etalk, Correspondent
– Episode dated March 18, 2009
– Episode dated March 20, 2009
– Episode dated April 3, 2009
– Episode dated April 23, 2009
– Episode dated April 27, 2009
– Episode dated August 17, 2009
– Episode dated August 19, 2009
– Episode dated August 20, 2009
– Episode dated August 27, 2009
– Episode dated September 3, 2009
– Episode dated September 10, 2009
– Episode dated October 12, 2009
– Episode dated October 16, 2009
– Episode dated December 2, 2009
– Episode dated January 28, 2010
– Episode dated April 7, 2010
– Episode dated April 28, 2010
– Episode dated June 29, 2010
 2009: CTV's "Interview with Jay-Z", Interviewer
 2008: Canadian Idol, Mentor
 2008: CTV's "Jammin in Jamaica with Jully Black", Host
 2008: Saving God, character: Aunt Essie
 2007: 'Da Kink in My Hair, character: Veronika
 2007: My Gift Is My Song: George Canyon Christmas (TV film), Musical guest
 2006: Words to Music: The Canadian Songwriters Hall of Fame 2006 (TV film)
 2005: Video on Trial
– Episode #1.28 (2006) … Herself
– Episode #1.9 (2005) … Herself
– Episode #1.2 (2005) … Herself

References

External links

 
 

1977 births
Living people
20th-century Black Canadian women singers
21st-century Black Canadian women singers
Actresses from Toronto
Black Canadian actresses
Canadian contemporary R&B singers
Canadian expatriates in Jamaica
Canadian women pop singers
Canadian women singer-songwriters
Canadian Idol
Canadian infotainers
Canadian Pentecostals
Canadian people of Jamaican descent
Canadian soul singers
Juno Award for R&B/Soul Recording of the Year winners
Musicians from Toronto
Feminist musicians
The Amazing Race Canada contestants